Constant Spring is a residential neighbourhood in the north of Kingston, Jamaica.

Constant Spring plantation
Constant Spring plantation was one of the Regimental Plantations. It was developed by Lt.-Colonel Henry Archibold during the military occupation following the English invasion of Jamaica. Commander William Brayne described it as "one of the best plantations in the island".

Popular culture
Constant Spring is referred to in a string of mid-1970s songs, Trinity's "Three Piece Suit and Thing", Lee Perry and Junior Dread's "Sufferer's Heights", and Althea and Donna's "Uptown Top Ranking".

References

Neighbourhoods in Kingston, Jamaica
Populated places in Saint Andrew Parish, Jamaica